= 2 øre (World War II Danish coin) =

Coin made during the German occupation of Denmark

- Denmark
- Value: 2 Danish øre
- Mass: 1.2-3.2 g
- Diameter: 21 mm
- Edge: Plain
- Composition: 100% Al (1941); 100% Zn (1942-1947)
- Years of minting: 1941-1947

Obverse
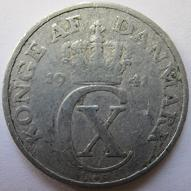
- Design: Crowned monogram of Christian X Lettering: KONGE AF DANMARK 1941 CX

Reverse
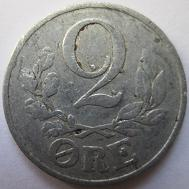
- Design: Denomination with oak and laurel leaves. Lettering: 2 ORE

The 2 øre coin was made during the German occupation of Denmark between 1941 and 1945, and then by the Danish government in 1947. It was first minted in aluminium, and then from 1942 to 1947 in zinc. The aluminium 2 øre is identical to the zinc variety, although the latter is a little heavier in weight.

== Mintage ==
1941 aluminium

Year	Mintage	Notes
1941	26,205,000	

1942-1947 zinc

Year	Mintage	Notes
1942	12,934,000	
1943	9,603,000	
1944	60,60,000	
1945	329,000	Rare
1947	589,000	Rare

== Gallery ==
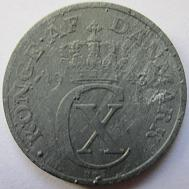
A zinc Danish 2 øre coin from 1943. (obverse)

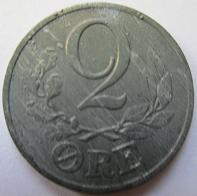
A zinc Danish 2 øre coin from 1943. (reverse)
